Tomas John Reffell (born 27 April 1999) is a Welsh professional rugby union player for Leicester Tigers in Premiership Rugby.  His usual position is flanker.  He was a Premiership Rugby champion in 2022.  He made his international debut for  against South Africa on 2 July 2022.

Career
Reffell began his junior career at his local club Pencoed RFC aged 4. He was part of the Ospreys under 16s and joined Leicester aged 15.

Reffell captained both Wales U18 and Wales U20.

Reffell made his debut for Leicester Tigers on 10 November 2017 in a 33–31 defeat against Bath at the Rec in the Anglo-Welsh Cup.

In March 2020, Reffell won the Premiership Rugby Cup Breakthrough Player award for his performances in that year's competition.

He was named man of the match by the Leicester Mercury following his performance in Tigers' win against Gloucester on 24 September 2021.

His form continued into the next season, earning plaudits as he scored twice in the win against Harlequins on 16 October 2022. On November 27 2022, he was named again named player of the match, scoring Leicester's fourth try in the win over London Irish.

After another spell of good form, in May 2022, Reffell was named in the  squad for their summer tour to South Africa. In June, Reffell started the 2022 Premiership Rugby final as Leicester won 15-12 against Saracens. The following match on 9 July 2022 saw him win the man of the match award, as Wales beat South Africa 13-12 for their first ever win against South Africa in South Africa.

Reffell kept his position into the 2022 Autumn Internationals, starting against New Zealand. Reffell was injured during the match, and played no further part in Wales's autumn campaign.

International tries

References

External links

 Leicester Tigers profile
 WRU profile

1999 births
Living people
Leicester Tigers players
Rugby union flankers
Rugby union players from Bridgend
Welsh rugby union players
Wales international rugby union players